Olivia Lauryn Dean (born 14 March 1999) is an English singer. She began her career working in collaboration with Rudimental. She was named Amazon Music's 2021 breakthrough artist of the year and recorded an exclusive version of Nat King Cole's "The Christmas Song" for Amazon's 2021 Christmas Originals line-up.

Early life
Dean was born in the London Borough of Haringey to an English father and a Jamaican-Guyanese mother and grew up in Walthamstow. She took musical theatre lessons and participated in a gospel choir from a young age. She then attended the BRIT School.

Influences
Dean has cited Lauryn Hill, Amy Winehouse, Carole King, and The Supremes as inspirations.

Discography

EPs

Singles
 "Reason to Stay" (2018)
 "Password Change" (2019)
 "Baby Come Home" (2020)
 "Crosswords" (2020)
 "The Hardest Part" (2020)
 "Merry Christmas Everyone" (2020)
 "Echo" (2020)
 "Be My Own Boyfriend" (2021)
 "Slowly" (2021)
 "The Christmas Song" (2021)
 "Danger" (2022)
 "UFO" (2023)

As featured artist
 "Free" (2017)
 "Adrenaline" (2019)

Music videos

Awards and nominations

References

Living people
1999 births
21st-century English women singers
21st-century English singers
English people of Guyanese descent
English people of Jamaican descent
English soul singers
People educated at the BRIT School
People from the London Borough of Enfield
People from Walthamstow
Singers from London